
Gmina Kleczew is an urban-rural gmina (administrative district) in Konin County, Greater Poland Voivodeship, in west-central Poland.

Villages
Apart from the town of Kleczew, Gmina Kleczew contains the villages and settlements of Adamowo, Alinowo, Białogród-Folwark, Białogród-Kolonia, Bolesławowo, Budy, Budzisław Górny, Budzisław Kościelny, Cegielnia, Cegielnia Łąka, Danków, Danków A, Dobromyśl, Genowefa, Helenowo, Izabelin, Jabłonka, Janowo, Józefowo, Jóźwin, Kalinowiec, Kamionka, Koziegłowy, Marszewo, Miłaczew, Modrzerzewo, Nieborzyn, Obrona, Przytuki, Roztoka, Słaboludź, Słaboludz-Kolonia, Sławoszewek, Sławoszewo, Słowiki, Spławce, Stogi, Tręby Stare, Wielkopole, Władysławowo, Wola Spławiecka, Zberzyn, Zberzynek and Złotków.

Neighbouring gminas
Gmina Kleczew is bordered by the gminas of Kazimierz Biskupi, Orchowo, Ostrowite, Powidz, Ślesin and Wilczyn.

References
Polish official population figures 2006

Kleczew
Konin County